The Hungry Range, or Hungry Mountain is a low, elongated mountain in Washoe County, Nevada, United States.  The mountain separates Hungry Valley on the east from Antelope Valley on the west.

References 

Mountains of Nevada
Mountains of Washoe County, Nevada